Charles "Lefty" Robinson (March 2, 1891 - August 14, 1974) was a Negro leagues pitcher from 1923 to 1932. He pitched and played for the Birmingham Black Barons, St. Louis Stars and Atlanta Black Crackers.

References

External links
 and Baseball-Reference Black Baseball stats and Seamheads

St. Louis Stars (baseball) players
Birmingham Black Barons players
1891 births
1974 deaths
People from New Madrid, Missouri
20th-century African-American sportspeople